The Ugly Truth  is a 2009 American romantic comedy film directed by Robert Luketic, written by Nicole Eastman, Karen McCullah Lutz and Kirsten Smith, and starring Katherine Heigl and Gerard Butler. The film was released in North America on July 24, 2009 by Columbia Pictures.

Plot 
Abby Richter is a morning show TV producer in Sacramento, California. Abby firmly believes in true love and is a big supporter of complex self-help books such as Chicken Soup for the Soul and Men Are from Mars, Women Are from Venus. Coming home from a disastrous date, she happens to see a segment of a local television show, The Ugly Truth, featuring Mike Chadway, whose cynicism about relationships prompts Abby to call in to argue with him on-air. The next day, she discovers the TV station is threatening to cancel her show because of its poor ratings. The station owner has hired Mike to do a segment on her show.

At first, the two have a rocky relationship; Abby thinks Mike is crass and disgusting while Mike finds her to be naive and a control freak. Nevertheless, when she meets the man of her dreams, a doctor named Colin living next door to her, Mike convinces her that by following his advice she will improve her chances with Colin. Abby is skeptical, but they make a deal: If Mike's management of her courtship results in her landing Colin, proving his theories on relationships, she will work happily and peacefully with him, but if Mike fails, he agrees to leave her show.

Mike succeeds in improving the show's ratings, brings married co-anchors Georgia and Larry closer and successfully instructs Abby to be exactly what Colin would want through a number of pointers including: always laugh at his jokes and say he is amazing in bed. Mike is invited to appear on The Late Late Show with Craig Ferguson and is offered a job at another network. Abby is forced to cancel a romantic weekend with Colin, during which they had planned to finally sleep together, and instead fly to Los Angeles to persuade Mike to stay with her show.

They drink and dance and Mike admits he does not want to move because he wants to stay in Sacramento near his sister and nephew. In the hotel elevator, they passionately kiss, but go to their separate rooms. Mike, dealing with the intensity of his feelings for Abby, calls on her room only to find Colin has shown up to surprise her. Mike leaves. Abby is upset and soon realizes Colin only likes the woman she has been pretending to be, not the real her. She breaks up with him.

Mike quits and takes a job with a rival TV station in Sacramento, and ends up doing a broadcast at the same hot air balloon festival as Abby. He cannot resist intruding when she kicks the new "Mike Chadway" imitator off the air and begins ranting about what cowardly weaklings men are. Going out of script, the balloon takes off while they argue. Abby says she broke up with Colin, and Mike admits he loves her. Abby kisses him while they fly off, all of which is broadcast due to a camera mounted in the balloon. The film ends with Abby and Mike in bed. When Mike asks if she was faking it, Abby responds with, "You’ll never know."

Cast 
 Katherine Heigl as Abigail "Abby" Richter, a romantically challenged morning show producer.
 Gerard Butler as Mike Chadway, her male chauvinist correspondent.
 Eric Winter as Colin Anderson, an orthopedic surgeon who lives across from Abby. In the alternate ending, he was in a relationship with Joy.
 Nick Searcy as Stuart, Abby and Mike's Boss
 Cheryl Hines as Georgia Bordeney, co-anchor of the morning show, married to Larry.
 John Michael Higgins as Larry Freeman, co-anchor of the morning show, married to Georgia.
 Bree Turner as Joy Haim, assistant and friend to Abby who is also love starved and lives vicariously through Abby. In the alternate ending she is shown to be in a relationship with Colin.
 Kevin Connolly as Jim Ryan, a blind date.
 Bonnie Somerville as Elizabeth Chadway, Mike's sister.
 Yvette Nicole Brown as Dori Coleman.
 Blake Robbins as KPQU Big Wig.
 Allen Maldonado as Duane.
 Craig Ferguson as himself.

Production 
The film was made by the producers of Legally Blonde and written by 
Nicole Eastman, Karen McCullah, and Kirsten Smith. Eastman wrote the original script, which then stayed in development for about a decade before McMullah and Smith performed a rewrite.

The Mike Chadway character is allegedly based on and inspired by Adam Carolla.
Gerard Butler sat in on The Adam Carolla Show, observing only, in order to prepare for his role.

Filming locations 
The film was, for the most part, filmed on location in California, including Sacramento, Los Angeles, and San Pedro, Los Angeles and Temecula. The montage sequence toward the end of the film includes the Foresthill Bridge near Auburn.

Reception

Critical response 
The review-aggregation website Rotten Tomatoes gives the film a score of 14% based on 176 reviews, and a weighted average of 3.80/10. The website's consensus reads, "Despite the best efforts of Butler and Heigl, The Ugly Truth suffers from a weak script that relies on romantic comedy formula, with little charm or comedic payoff." Moviegoers, unlike many critics, thought much higher of the film. Audiences polled by CinemaScore gave the film an average grade of "A−" on an A+ to F scale.

Rolling Stone critic Peter Travers gave the film a half star out of four, stating: "There's not a genuine laugh in it [...] Toss this ugly-ass crap to the curb, along with the other multiplex garbage, and see a romance that gets it right. I'm talking (500) Days of Summer." Time named it one of the top 10 worst chick flicks.
The A.V. Club gave the film a D.
Critic Roger Ebert of the Chicago Sun-Times gave the film two out of four stars, saying that Heigl and Butler were "pleasant" but "the movie does them in." He commented on the restaurant scene that also was a red-band clip on YouTube, saying that "Heigl makes a real effort" but that Meg Ryan's scene in When Harry Met Sally... was the gold standard "in this rare but never boring category". As for portraying the morning news realistically, he says "the film makes Anchorman: The Legend of Ron Burgundy look like a documentary".

Ruth McCann of The Washington Post called the film "indulgently glossy, refreshingly snarky and legitimately sexy".
Kara Nesvig of the Star Tribune said "the dialogue is snappy and sexy, Heigl and Butler spar with zingy chemistry, and though the ending is as predictable as you'd assume, it's a sexy sort of popcorn flick". Nesvig praises Heigl saying the film "adds up to more than the sum of its clichés".

Box office 

The film opened to third place at the box office—behind Harry Potter and the Half-Blood Prince (in its second weekend) and the newly released G-Force—with $27,605,576 and the highest per-screen average in the top 10. As of July 2, 2018, the film has grossed $88.9 million at the North American domestic box office and $116.3 million internationally for a worldwide total of $205.2 million, becoming Katherine Heigl's second best grossing film behind Knocked Up.

In Great Britain and Ireland, the film topped the box office and took in £1.9 million in its opening weekend, fighting off competition from G.I. Joe: The Rise of Cobra, which entered at number two with £1.7 million.

Home media 
The Ugly Truth was released on DVD and Blu-ray on November 10, 2009.

References

External links 
 
 
 
 

2009 films
2009 romantic comedy films
American romantic comedy films
Columbia Pictures films
Films about television
Films directed by Robert Luketic
Films produced by Gary Lucchesi
Films scored by Aaron Zigman
Films set in Sacramento, California
Films shot in Sacramento, California
Lakeshore Entertainment films
Relativity Media films
2000s English-language films
2000s American films
English-language romantic comedy films